PS Countess of Erne was a paddle steamer passenger vessel operated by the London and North Western Railway from 1868 to 1889.

History

She was built by Walpole, Webb & Bewley, Dublin for the London and North Western Railway in 1868.

Countess of Erne was damaged by fire at Holyhead, Anglesey on 30 January 1875. She was sold to the Bristol General Steam Navigation Company in 1889 and used for a couple of years before being sold for scrap.

She was then used as a coal hulk in various ports. Finally she sank in Portland Harbour on 16 September 1935 and is a popular site with scuba divers for training dives.

References

1868 ships
Passenger ships of the United Kingdom
Steamships
Ships of the London and North Western Railway
Paddle steamers of the United Kingdom
Maritime incidents in January 1875